August Omtvedt (August 31, 1881 – November 25, 1953) was an American businessman and politician

Omtvedt was born on a farm in Telemark, Norway, and emigrated to the United States. He settled in Two Harbors, Lake County, Minnesota in 1901 with his wife and family. Omtvedt was a merchant and was the owner of a retail store. Omtvedt served as the mayor, the clerk of Two Harbors and on its city council. He also served on the Lake County Commission and was the chair of the county commission. Omtvelt served in the Minnesota House of Representatives in 1937 and 1938 and in 1941 and 1942. He died at St. Luke's Hospital in Duluth, Minnesota. The funeral and burial were in Two Harbors.

References

1881 births
1953 deaths
Norwegian emigrants to the United States
People from Telemark
People from Two Harbors, Minnesota
Businesspeople from Minnesota
Mayors of places in Minnesota
Minnesota city council members
County commissioners in Minnesota
Members of the Minnesota House of Representatives